Mathadana is a 2001 Indian Kannada language film directed by T. N. Seetharam, based on S. L. Bhyrappa's novel of the same name, and starring Anant Nag, Tara, Devaraj, Avinash and Hemanth Vasisht in pivotal roles.

At the 48th National Film Awards, the film won the National Film Award for Best Feature Film in Kannada. At the 2000-01 Karnataka State Film Awards, Avinash won the award for Best Supporting Actor.

Cast

 Anant Nag as Ramalinge Gowda
 Tara as Lakshmi
 Devaraj
 Avinash as Puttathammayya
 Hemanth Vasisht as Dr. Shivappa
 Sundar Raj
 Mukhyamantri Chandru
 Prakash Belawadi
 Sudha Belawadi as Sunanda
 Karibasavaiah
 Girija Lokesh
 Sihi Kahi Chandru
 Lakshmi Chandrashekar

Production

Soundtrack

C. Aswath and V. Manohar composed the music for the film and the soundtracks. The soundtrack "Aluva Kadalolu Theli" was taken from a poem written by poet Gopalakrishna Adiga and "Naayi Thalimyalina" by poet H. S. Venkateshamurthy. The album has seven soundtracks and was released in the form of audio cassettes in the second week of January 2001.

References

External links 
Movie review

2001 films
Films scored by C. Ashwath
2000s Kannada-language films
Films based on Indian novels
Films scored by V. Manohar
Best Kannada Feature Film National Film Award winners
Films directed by T. N. Seetharam